The year 539 BC was a year of the pre-Julian Roman calendar. In the Roman Empire, it was known as year 215  Ab urbe condita. The denomination 539 BC for this year has been used since the early-medieval period, when the Anno Domini calendar era became the prevalent method in Europe for naming years.

Events

By place

Near East 
 September 25–28? – Battle of Opis: Troops of the Persian Achaemenid Empire under Cyrus the Great decisively defeat those of the Neo-Babylonian Empire.
 October 29 – Fall of Babylon: Achaemenid troops under Gobryas enter Babylon unopposed. Cyrus enters the city, incorporating the Neo-Babylonian Empire into the Achaemenid Empire and turning the latter into the largest in the history of the world up until that point.

Births

Deaths 
 Nabonidus, last king of Babylon
 Belshazzar, co-regent of Babylon

References